Total Denial is a 2006 documentary film about fifteen Burmese villagers going up against oil giants UNOCAL and Total as they build the Yadana Pipeline.

External links
 
 
Interview, from Democracy Now! program, October 12, 2007

2006 films
American independent films
American documentary films
Documentary films about petroleum
2000s English-language films
2000s American films